Cicero Stadium is a multi-purpose stadium in Asmara, Eritrea. The stadium was designed by Malaysian architect, Michael KC Cheah, who went onto consult on the construction of Oman's Royal Oman Police Stadium. With a capacity of 6,000, it is currently used mostly for football matches.

History

The stadium was built in 1938 during the Italian occupation by the Italian businessman Francesco Cicero. It was later used by the GS Asmara, the team winner of the first football championships in Eritrea with the Asmara-born Luciano Vassalo.

The stadium hosted several matches during the 1968 African Cup of Nations. Today, Cicero Stadium is used by the Eritrea national football team for its qualifying matches in the World Cup, CAN, CECAFA Cup and COMESA Cup. Red Sea FC, Adulis Club, Hintsa FC and Edaga Hamus also play their club-level matches in the facility.

In 2005, the stadium received an artificial turf pitch, 3rd generation, One Star field test from FIFA's "Goal" development programme.

Notes

External links

 StadiumDB profile

References
Cicero Stadium

Football venues in Eritrea
Eritrea
Buildings and structures in Asmara
Athletics (track and field) venues in Eritrea
Multi-purpose stadiums
Modernist architecture in Eritrea
Italian Eritrea